Public education in Raleigh, North Carolina, is served by the Wake County Public School System and more than a dozen independent public charter schools.

Public high schools
Athens Drive High School is a co-educational secondary Wake County publicly funded high school that serves grades 9–12.  In 2004–2005 the school had approximately 1,747 enrolled students and approximately 130 hired educators.
Needham B. Broughton High School was founded in 1929 and is a co-educational, International Baccalaureate secondary Wake County publicly funded high school that serves grades 9–12.  In 2005–2006, the school had approximately 2,157 enrolled students and approximately 150 hired educators.
William G. Enloe High School opened in 1962. When it opened, it was the first integrated school in Raleigh.
Leesville Road High School is a co-educational secondary Wake County public high school. It was built in 1993.
Millbrook High School is a co-educational secondary Wake County public high school
Jesse O. Sanderson High School is a co-educational secondary Wake County public high school that serves grades 9–12. As of 2004–2005, the school has approximately 1,800 enrolled students and approximately 150 hired educators.
Southeast Raleigh Magnet High School is a co-educational secondary Wake County public high school with a Leadership & Technology Magnet Program. The school opened in July 1997 Southeast Raleigh HS Website
Wakefield High School is a co-educational secondary Wake County public high school that opened in August 2000, making it Raleigh's newest public high school.
Mary E. Phillips High School
Raleigh Charter High School

Public middle schools
 Carnage Middle School
 Carroll Middle School
 Centennial Campus Middle School
 Daniels Middle School
 Dillard Drive Middle School
 Durant Road Middle School
 East Millbrook Middle School
 East Wake Middle School
 The Exploris School is a charter school founded in 1997 and located in downtown Raleigh, currently serving grades K-8 between the middle and elementary schools. 
 Holly Ridge Middle School
 Leesville Road Middle School
 John W. Ligon Middle School is a magnet middle school. Ligon is located in downtown Raleigh on Lenior Street.
 Magellan Charter School
 Martin Middle School
 Moore Square Museums Magnet Middle School
 West Millbrook Middle School

Public elementary schools
Bugg Elementary
Brooks Elementary
Casa Esperanza Montessori Charter School and Preschool is a public dual-language English / Spanish Montessori school for grades K-8 and a private dual-language preschool for children ages 3 and 4. 
Combs Elementary
Emma Conn Elementary
Durant Road Elementary
Fuller GT Magnet Elementary
Green Year Round Elementary
Jeffreys Grove Elementary
Lacy Elementary
The Exploris School is a charter school which expanded to elementary starting the school year of 2014-2015. It currently serves K-8 between the elementary and middle schools.
Leesville Road Elementary
Lucille Hunter Elementary School
Lynn Road Elementary
Magellan Charter School
Mary P. Douglas Elementary
North Ridge Elementary
Olds Elementary
Partnership Elementary
Pleasant Union Elementary
Poe Elementary
Reedy Creek Elementary
Root Elementary
Stough Elementary
Swift Creek Elementary
Underwood Elementary
Vena Wilburn Elementary
Washington Elementary
Wiley International Magnet Elementary
York Elementary

Public elementary schools in North Carolina
Public middle schools in North Carolina
Public high schools in North Carolina
 
Raleigh